Georges Jacques Danton (26 October 1759 – 5 April 1794) was a French lawyer and a leading figure in the French Revolution. He became a deputy to the Paris Commune, presided in the Cordeliers district, and visited the Jacobin club. In August 1792 he became French Minister of Justice and was responsible for inciting the September Massacres. In Spring 1793 he supported the foundation of a Revolutionary Tribunal and became the first president of the Committee of Public Safety. Georges Jacques Danton was a key figure in the case of Dumouriez. After the Insurrection of 31 May – 2 June 1793 he changed his mind on the use of force and lost his seat in the committee; Danton and Robespierre became rivals. In early October 1793, he left politics but was urged to return to Paris to plead, as a moderate, for an end to the Terror. Danton's continual criticism of the Committee of Public Safety provoked further counter-attacks. At the end of March 1794, Danton made a speech announcing the end of the Terror. Within a week, he became embroiled in a scandal concerning the bankruptcy proceedings of the French East India Company and was guillotined by the advocates of revolutionary terror after accusations of conspiracy, venality and leniency toward the enemies of the Revolution.

Danton's role in the onset of the Revolution has been disputed, especially during the French Third Republic; many historians describe him as "the chief force in the overthrow of the French monarchy and the establishment of the First French Republic".

Early life

Danton was born in Arcis-sur-Aube (Champagne in northeastern France) to Jacques Danton, a respectable, but not wealthy lawyer, and Mary Camus. As a baby, he was attacked by a bull and run over by pigs, which, along with smallpox, resulted in the disfigurement and scarring of his face. He initially attended the school in Sézanne, and at the age of thirteen he left his parents' home to enter the seminary in Troyes. While attending school in Troyes, his classmate and friend Jules-François Paré was to have his hands rapped as punishment, but Danton defended his friend and spoke out against corporal punishment in class. Danton spoke so persuasively that the head of the school decided to ban the practice. In 1780, he settled in Paris, where he became a clerk. In 1784, he started studying law, and in 1787 he became a member of the Conseil du Roi. He married Antoinette Gabrielle Charpentier (c. 1762 – 10 February 1793) on 14 June 1787 at the church of Saint-Germain-l'Auxerrois. The couple lived in a six-room apartment in the heart of the Left Bank (near the Café Procope), and had three sons:

 François, born in May 1788, died in infancy on 24 April 1789.
 Antoine, born on 18 June 1790, died on 14 June 1858.
 François Georges, born on 2 February 1792, died on 18 June 1848.

Revolution

From 14 July 1789, the day of the storming of the Bastille, Danton volunteered in the Guards of his district. He and his district opposed the Marquis de LaFayette, the commander of the National Guard, and Jean Sylvain Bailly, the provisional mayor. In early October, he was elected president of his section (around the Cordeliers Convent) and deputy to the Commune.

His house in the Rue des Cordeliers was open to many people from the neighborhood. Danton, Desmoulins, and Marat, who lived around the corner, all used the nearby Cafe Procope as a meeting place. Danton protected Marat, and in March 1790, LaFayette ordered Danton detained. Paris Commune was divided up into 48 sections and allowed to gather separately. Danton was removed from office by a redistricting of Paris, for which he was compensated.

On 27 April 1790, he became president of the Club de Cordeliers. On 2 August, Bailly became Paris' first elected mayor; Danton had 49 votes, Marat and Louis XVI only one each. In spring 1791, Danton suddenly began investing in property, in or near his birthplace, on a large scale.

Robespierre, Pétion, Danton, and Brissot dominated the Jacobin Club. On 17 July 1791, Danton initiated a petition. Robespierre went to the Jacobin club to cancel the draft of the petition, according to Albert Mathiez. Robespierre persuaded the Jacobin clubs not to support the petition by Danton and Brissot. After the Champ de Mars massacre, Danton escaped from Paris and then lived in London for a few weeks. Since Jean-Paul Marat, Danton, and Robespierre were no longer delegates of the Assembly, politics often took place outside the meeting hall.

On 9 August, Danton returned from Arcis. In the evening before the storming of the Tuileries, he was visited by Desmoulins, his wife, and Fréron. After dinner, he went to the Cordeliers and preferred to go to bed early. It seems he went to the Maison-Commune after midnight. The next day, he was appointed minister of justice; he appointed Fabre and Desmoulins as his secretaries. More than a hundred decisions left the department within eight days. On 14 August, Danton invited Robespierre to join the Council of Justice, which Robespierre declined to do.

Danton seems to have dined almost every day at the Rolands. On 28 August, the Assembly ordered a curfew for the next two days. At the behest of Danton, thirty commissioners from the sections were ordered to search in every suspect house for weapons, munition, swords, carriages and horses. By 2 September, between 520 and 1,000 people were taken into custody on the flimsiest of warrants. The exact number of those arrested will never be known.

On Sunday 2 September, at about 13:00, Danton, as a member of the provisional government, delivered a speech in the assembly: "We ask that anyone refusing to give personal service or to furnish arms shall be punished with death". "The tocsin we are about to ring is not an alarm signal; it sounds the charge on the enemies of our country." He continued after the applause: "To conquer them we must dare, dare again, always dare, and France is saved!". His speech acted as a call for direct action among the citizens, as well as a strike against the external enemy.  Many believe this speech was responsible for inciting the September Massacres. It is estimated that around 1,100-1,600 people were murdered. Madame Roland held Danton responsible for their deaths. Danton was also accused by the French historians Adolphe Thiers, Alphonse de Lamartine, Jules Michelet, Louis Blanc and Edgar Quinet. However, according to Albert Soboul, there is no proof that the massacres were organized by Danton or by anyone else, though it is certain that he did nothing to stop them.

On 6 September, he was elected by his section, "Théâtre Français", to be a deputy for the convention, gathering on 22 September. Danton remained a member of the ministry, although holding both positions simultaneously was illegal. Danton, Robespierre, and Marat were accused of forming a triumvirate. On 26 September, Danton was forced to give up his position in the government; he stepped down on 9 October. At the end of October, he defended Robespierre in the convention on charges of establishing a dictatorship.

On 10 February 1793, while Danton was on a mission in Belgium, his wife died while giving birth to their fourth child, who also died. Danton was so affected by their deaths that he recruited the sculptor Claude André Deseine and, a week after Charpentier's death, brought him to Sainte-Catherine cemetery to exhume her body and execute a plaster bust of her appearance.

On 10 March, Danton supported the foundation of a Revolutionary Tribunal. He proposed the release of all imprisoned debtors as conscripts in the army. On 6 April, the Committee of Public Safety, which was then composed of only nine members, was installed on the proposal of Maximin Isnard, who was supported by Georges Danton. Danton was appointed a member of the committee. He and other members of the committee, despite its primary charge of defeating invasion and internal rebellions, were advocates of the moderation necessary to minimize popular resistance to military requisitions. Due to military reversals in 1793, many - especially among the sans-culottes - criticized its conduct, and subsequent committee membership included more radical thinkers who pressed for more extreme measures to ensure victory over enemies of the Revolution internal and external. On 20 March Danton and Charles-François Delacroix were sent to Lille. Dumouriez sensed a trap and invited them to his headquarters at Saint-Amand-les-Eaux. They were escorted by Chevalier de Saint-Georges. On 27 April, the Convention decreed (on the proposal of Danton) to send additional military forces to the departments in revolt.

On 1 June Hanriot was ordered to fire a cannon on the Pont-Neuf as a sign of alarm. When the Convention assembled Danton rushed to the tribune: "Break up the Commission of Twelve! You have heard the thunder of the cannon. Girondins protested against the closing of the city gates, against the tocsin and alarm-gun without the approval of the convention; Vergniaud suggested arresting Henriot. That night Paris changed into a military camp according to Otto Flake. On 2 June according to Louis Madelin and Mignet a large force of armed citizens, some estimated 80,000 or 100,000, but Danton spoke of only 30,000, surrounded the Convention with 48 pieces of artillery. The next day the Interior minister Garat forced Danton to disavow the events from the evening before.

On 1 July 1793, Danton married Louise Sébastienne Gély, aged 16, daughter of Marc-Antoine Gély, court usher (huissier-audiencier) at the Parlement de Paris and member of the Club des Cordeliers. On 10 July, he was not re-elected as a member of the Committee of Public Safety. Seventeen days later, Maximilien Robespierre joined the Committee of Public Safety, nearly two years after Danton had extended an invitation to him to do so. On 5 September, Danton argued for a law to give the sans-culottes a small compensation for attending the twice-weekly section meetings, and to provide a gun to every citizen.

Reign of Terror

On 6 September, Danton refused to take a seat in the Comité de Salut Public, declaring that he would join no committee, but would be a spur to them all. He believed a stable government was needed which could resist the orders of the Comité de Salut Public. On 10 October, Danton, who had been dangerously ill for a few weeks, quit politics, and set off to Arcis-sur-Aube with his 16-year-old wife, who had pitied Queen Marie Antoinette since her trial began.  On 18 November, after the arrest of François Chabot, Edme-Bonaventure Courtois urged Danton to come back to Paris to again play a role in politics.

On 22 November, Danton attacked religious persecution and demanded frugality with human lives. He tried to weaken the Terror by attacking Jacques René Hébert. On 3 December, Robespierre accused Danton in the Jacobin club of feigning an illness with the intention to emigrate to Switzerland, declaring that Danton showed too often his vices and not his virtue. Robespierre was stopped in his attack. The gathering was closed after thunderous applause for Danton. Danton maintained that he had absolutely no intention of breaking the revolutionary impulse.

On 9 December, Danton became embroiled in a scandal concerning the bankruptcy proceedings of the French East India Company, when it was discovered that directors of the company had bribed certain government officials to allow the company to liquidate its own assets, rather than the government controlling the process. By December, a Dantonist party had been formed in support of Danton's more moderate views and his insistence on clemency for those who had violated the Committee for Public Safety's increasingly arbitrary and Draconian "counter-revolutionary" measures. Robespierre replied to Danton's plea for an end to the Terror on 25 December (5 Nivôse, year II).

The French National Convention during the autumn of 1793 began to assert its authority further throughout France, creating the bloodiest period of the French Revolution, during which some historians assert approximately 40,000 people were killed in France. Following the fall of the Girondins, a group known as the Indulgents would emerge from amongst the Montagnards as the legislative right within the convention, with Danton as their most vocal leader. Having long supported the progressive acts of the Committee of Public Safety, Danton would begin to propose that the Committee retract legislation instituting terror as "the order of the day."

On 26 February 1794, Saint-Just delivered a speech before the Convention in which he  directed the assault against Danton, claiming that the Dantonists wanted to slow down the Terror and the Revolution. Self-indulgent over-eating, especially when flaunted in public, was an indication of suspect political loyalties, according to Saint-Just. It seems Danton became exasperated by Robespierre's repeated references to virtue. On 6 March, Barère attacked the Hébertists and Dantonists.

While the Committee of Public Safety was concerned with strengthening the centralist policies of the convention and its own grip over that body, Danton was in the process of devising a plan that would effectively move popular sentiment among delegates towards a more moderate stance. This meant adopting values popular among the sans-culotte, notably the control of bread prices that had seen drastic increase with the famine that was being experienced throughout France. Danton also proposed that the Convention begin taking actions towards peace with foreign powers, as the committee had declared war on the majority of European powers, such as Britain, Spain, and Portugal.  Danton made a triumphant speech announcing the end of the Terror. As Robespierre listened, he was convinced that Danton was pushing for leadership in a post-Terror government. If Robespierre did not counter-attack quickly, the Dantonists could seize control of the National Convention and bring an end to his Republic of Virtue.

The Reign of Terror was not a policy that could be easily transformed. Indeed, it would eventually continue past the Thermidorian Reaction (27 July 1794), when some members of the Convention rose against the committee, executed its leaders, and placed power in the hands of new men with a new policy- to dissolve Jacobinism (White Terror). However, in Germinal—that is, in March 1794—the anti-Terror sentiment had not yet reached critical mass. The committees were still too strong to be overthrown, and Danton, heedless, instead of striking with vigor in the convention, waited to be struck. "In these latter days", wrote Morley in the Encyclopædia Britannica Eleventh Edition, "a certain discouragement seems to have come over his spirit". His wife, Gabrielle, had died during his absence on one of his expeditions to the armies; he had her body exhumed so as to see her again. Despite genuine grief, Danton quickly married again, and, Morley continues, "the rumour went that he was allowing domestic happiness to tempt him from the keen incessant vigilance proper to the politician in such a crisis."

Ultimately, Danton himself would become a victim of the Terror. In attempting to shift the direction of the revolution by collaborating with Camille Desmoulins on the production of Le Vieux Cordelier—a newspaper that called for the end of the official Terror and Dechristianization, as well as for launching new peace overtures to France's enemies—Danton had placed himself in a precarious position. Those most closely associated with the Committee of Public Safety, among them key figures such as Maximilien Robespierre and Georges Couthon, would eventually indict Danton for counter-revolutionary activities.

Financial corruption and accusations

Toward the end of the Reign of Terror, Danton was accused of various financial misdeeds, as well as using his position within the Revolution for personal gain. Many of his contemporaries commented on Danton's financial success during the Revolution, certain acquisitions of money that he could not adequately explain. Many of the specific accusations directed against him were based on insubstantial or ambiguous evidence. For the Revolutionary Tribunal legal evidence was unnecessary, moral conviction by jury was enough to speed up the proceedings.

Between 1791 and 1793, Danton faced many allegations, including taking bribes during the insurrection of August 1792, helping his secretaries to line their pockets, and forging assignats during his mission to Belgium. Perhaps the most compelling evidence of financial corruption was a letter from Mirabeau to Danton in March 1791 that casually referred to 30,000 livres that Danton had received in payment.

During his tenure on the Committee of Public Safety, Danton organized a peace treaty agreement with Sweden. Although the Swedish government never ratified the treaty, on 28 June 1793, the convention voted to pay 4 million livres to the Swedish Regent for diplomatic negotiations. According to Bertrand Barère, a journalist and member of the convention, Danton had taken a portion of this money which was intended for the Swedish Regent. Barère's accusation was never supported by any form of evidence.

The most serious accusation, which haunted him during his arrest and formed a chief ground for his execution, was his alleged involvement with a scheme to appropriate the wealth of the French East India Company. During the reign of the Old Regime, the original French East India Company went bankrupt. It was later revived in 1785, backed by royal patronage. The Company eventually fell under the notice of the National Convention for profiteering during the war. The company was soon liquidated while certain members of the Convention tried to push through a decree that would cause the share prices to rise before the liquidation. Discovery of the profits from this insider trading led to the blackmailing of the directors of the company to turn over half a million livres to known associates of Danton. While there was no hard evidence that Danton was involved, he was vigorously denounced by François Chabot, and implicated by the fact that Fabre d’Eglantine, a Dantonist, was implicated in the scandal. After Chabot was arrested on 17 November, Courtois urged Danton to return to Paris immediately.

In December 1793, the journalist Camille Desmoulins launched a new journal, Le Vieux Cordelier, attacking François Chabot and defending Danton in the first issue. In the second, Desmoulins attacked the use of terror as a governing tactic, comparing Robespierre with Julius Caesar  and, in the following issue, arguing that the Revolution should return to its original ideas which were in vogue around 10 August 1792. Robespierre replied to Danton's plea for an end to the Terror on 25 December (5 Nivôse, year II). Danton continued to defend Fabre d'Eglantine even after the latter had been exposed and arrested.

By February 1794, Danton was exasperated by Robespierre's repeated references to virtue as the foundation of the revolutionary government. Danton's continual criticism of the Committee of Public Safety provoked further counter-attacks. On 26 February 1794, Saint-Just, the president of the Convention, delivered a speech in which he directed the assault against Danton.

At the end of March 1794, Danton made a triumphant speech announcing the end of the Terror. Some government members were convinced that Danton was pushing for leadership in a post-Terror government.  For several months, Robespierre had resisted arresting Danton. According to Linton, Robespierre had to choose between friendship and virtue. His aim was to sow enough doubt in the minds of the deputies regarding Danton's political integrity to make it possible to proceed against him. Robespierre refused to see Desmoulins and rejected a private appeal. Then Robespierre broke with Danton, who had angered many other members of the Committee of Public Safety with his more moderate views on the Terror, but whom Robespierre had, until this point, persisted in defending.

Arrest, trial, and execution

On 30 March, the two committees decided to arrest Danton, Desmoulins, Marie-Jean Hérault de Séchelles, and Pierre Philippeaux without giving them a chance to be heard in the convention. On 2 April, the trial began on charges of conspiracy with the Duke of Orléans and Dumouriez. Theft, corruption, and a financial scandal involving the French East India Company provided a "convenient pretext" for Danton's downfall. The Dantonists, in Robespierre's eyes, had become false patriots who had preferred personal and foreign interests to the welfare of the nation. Robespierre was sharply critical of  Amar's report, which presented the scandal as purely a matter of fraud. Robespierre insisted that it was a foreign plot, demanded that the report be re-written, and used the scandal as the basis for rhetorical attacks on William Pitt the Younger who he believed was involved. Louis Legendre suggested hearing Danton in the convention, but Robespierre replied, "It would be violating the laws of impartiality to grant to Danton what was refused to others, who had an equal right to make the same demand." This answer silenced at once all solicitations in his favor. No friend of the Dantonists dared speak up, in case he too should be accused of putting friendship before virtue. The juror Souberbielle asked himself: "Which of the two, Robespierre or Danton, is the more useful to the Republic?" The death of Hébert had rendered Robespierre master of the Paris Commune; the death of Danton would make him master of the convention as well.

The directors of the company were never interrogated at all. At his trial, Danton made such a commotion that Fouquier-Tinville, was unnerved. Saint-Just had a bill rushed through the convention, cutting off further debate at the Tribunal. Saint-Just helped to pass a law that prevented any accused from speaking in his own defense. Fouquier-Tinville asked the tribunal to order the defendants who "confused the hearing" and insulted "National Justice" to the guillotine.

Danton displayed such vehemence before the revolutionary tribunal that his enemies feared he would gain the crowd's favour. The convention, in one of its "worst fits of cowardice", assented to a proposal made by Louis Antoine de Saint-Just during the trial that, if a prisoner showed want of respect for justice, the tribunal might exclude the prisoner from further proceeding and pronounce sentence in his absence.

Danton, Desmoulins, and many other actual or accused Dantonist associates were tried from 3–5 April before the Revolutionary Tribunal. The trial was less criminal in nature than political, and as such unfolded in an irregular fashion. The jury had only seven members, despite the law demanding twelve, as it was deemed that only seven jurors could be relied on to return the required verdict. During the trial, Danton made lengthy and violent attacks on the Committee of Public Safety. Both his accused associates and Danton demanded the right to have witnesses appear on their behalf; and submitted requests. "I leave it all in a frightful welter", Danton said. "Not a man of them has an idea of government. Robespierre will follow me; he is dragged down by me. Ah, better to be a poor fisherman than to meddle with the government of men!".

The Court's president, Martial Herman, was unable to control the proceedings until the National Convention passed the aforementioned decree, which prevented the accused from further defending themselves. These facts, together with confusing and often incidental denunciations (for instance, a report that Danton, while engaged in political work in Brussels, had appropriated a carriage filled with two or three hundred thousand pounds worth of table linen) and threats made by prosecutor Antoine Quentin Fouquier-Tinville towards members of the jury, ensured a guilty verdict. The defendants, of whom nine were députés of the convention, were removed from the room before the verdict was delivered and, by cutting their hair, prepared for the guillotine.

Danton was one member of a group of fifteen people beheaded on 5 April 1794, a group that included Marie Jean Hérault de Séchelles, Philippe Fabre d'Églantine and Pierre Philippeaux among others; Desmoulins died third and Danton last. His last words, spoken to his executioner were to ''show the people my head. It is well worth seeing.''

Danton and his guillotined associates were buried in the Errancis Cemetery, a common place of interment for those executed during the Revolution. In the mid-19th century, their skeletal remains were transferred to the Catacombs of Paris.

On 9 Thermidor, when Garnier de l’Aube witnessed Robespierre's inability to respond, he shouted, "The blood of Danton chokes him!" Robespierre then finally regained his voice to reply with his one recorded statement of the morning, a demand to know why he was now being blamed for the other man's death: "Is it Danton you regret? ... Cowards! Why didn't you defend him?"

Character disputes
Danton's influence and character during the French Revolution were, and still are, widely disputed among many historians, with the varied perspectives on him ranging from corrupt and violent to generous and patriotic. Danton did not leave very much in the way of written works, personal or political; therefore most information about his actions and personality has been derived from secondhand sources.

One view of Danton, presented by historians like Thiers and Mignet, suggested he was "a gigantic revolutionary" with extravagant passions, a high level of intelligence, and an eagerness for violence in the pursuit of his goals. Another portrait of Danton emerges from the work of Lamartine, who called Danton a man "devoid of honor, principles, and morality" who found only excitement and a chance for distinction during the French Revolution. He was a mere "statesman of materialism" who was bought anew every day. Any revolutionary moments were staged for the prospect of glory and more wealth.

A differing perspective on Danton is presented by Robinet, whose assessment is more positive and portrays him as a figure worthy of admiration. According to Robinet, Danton was a committed, loving, generous citizen, son, father, and husband. He remained loyal to his friends and the country of France by avoiding "personal ambition" and gave himself wholly to the cause of keeping "the government consolidated" for the Republic. He always had a love for his country and the laboring masses, who he felt deserved "dignity, consolation, and happiness".

 wrote that Danton stands out as a master of commanding phrase. One of his fierce sayings has become a proverb. Against the Duke of Brunswick and the invaders, "il nous faut de l'audace, et encore de l'audace, et toujours de l'audace"—"We need daring, and yet more daring, and always daring!". According to Georges Lefebvre he was nonchalant and lazy. He is seen as an optimist, a leader full of energy, who liked the pleasures of the life, carefree and indulgent.

Fictionalized accounts

Danton, Robespierre, and Marat are characters in Victor Hugo's novel Ninety-Three (Quatrevingt-treize), set during the French Revolution.
Danton is a central character in Romanian playwright Camil Petrescu's play of the same name.
Danton's last days were made into a play, Dantons Tod (Danton's Death), by Georg Büchner.
On the basis of Büchner's play, Gottfried von Einem wrote an opera with the same title, on a libretto by himself and Boris Blacher, which premiered on 6 August 1947 at the Salzburger Festspiele.
Danton appears in the Hungarian play The Tragedy of Man and the animated movie of the same name as one of Adam's incarnations throughout Lucifer's illusion.
Danton's life from 1791 until his execution was the subject of the 1921 German film Danton.
Danton's and Robespierre's quarrels were turned into a 1983 film, Danton, directed by Andrzej Wajda. The film itself is loosely based on Stanisława Przybyszewska's 1929 play Sprawa Dantona ("The Danton Case").
Danton's and Robespierre's relations were also the subject of an opera by American composer John Eaton, Danton and Robespierre (1978).
Danton is extensively featured in La Révolution française (1989),.
In his novel Locus Solus, Raymond Roussel tells a story in which Danton makes an arrangement with his executioner for his head to be smuggled into his friend's possession after his execution. The nerves and musculature of the head ultimately end up on display in the private collection of Martial Canterel, reanimated by special electrical currents and showing a deeply entrenched disposition toward oratory.
The Revolution as experienced by Danton, Robespierre, and Desmoulins is the central focus of Hilary Mantel's novel A Place of Greater Safety (1993).
Danton and Desmoulins are the main characters of Tanith Lee's The Gods Are Thirsty—A Novel of the French Revolution (1996).
Danton and Robespierre are briefly referred to in the book The Scarlet Pimpernel. The two men both applaud a guard for his work in catching aristocrats.
In The Tangled Thread, Volume 10 of The Morland Dynasty, a series of historical novels by author Cynthia Harrod-Eagles, the character Henri-Marie Fitzjames Stuart, bastard offshoot of the fictional Morland family, allies himself with Danton in an attempt to protect his family as the storm clouds of revolution gather over France.
Danton appears briefly in Rafael Sabatini's adventure novel Scaramouche: A tale of romance in the French Revolution.
Danton appears in a series of comics entitled "The Last Days of Georges Danton" in Step Aside, Pops: A Hark! A Vagrant Collection by Kate Beaton.
Danton is one of six point-of-view characters in Marge Piercy's novel City of Darkness, City of Light (1996).
Danton, along with Marat and Robespierre, is a secondary character in the 1927 epic Napoléon. His portrayal in the film is somewhat cartoonish, as he is depicted as a decadent fop, albeit dedicated to republicanism and revolution, and it is he that allows Rouget de Lisle to premiere "La Marseillaise" at the Club des Cordeliers. (In reality, no such performance by Rouget de Lisle is known to have taken place.)

References

Sources

Further reading

 François Furet and Mona Ozouf (eds.), A Critical Dictionary of the French Revolution. Cambridge, MA: Belknap Press of Harvard University Press, 1989; pp. 213–223.
 Laurence Gronlund, Ça Ira! or Danton in the French Revolution. Boston: Lee and Shepard, 1887.
 Norman Hampson, Danton. New York: Holmes & Meier Publishers, 1978.
 David Lawday, Danton: The Giant of the French Revolution. London: Jonathan Cape, 2009.
 Marisa Linton, Choosing Terror: Virtue, Friendship and Authenticity in the French Revolution (Oxford University Press, 2013).
 A Letter from Danton to Marie Antoinette by Carl Becker. In: The American Historical Review, Vol. 27, No. 1 (Oct. 1921), p. 29 Published by: Oxford University Press on behalf of the American Historical Association 
 VOICES OF REVOLT SPEECHES OF GEORGE JACQUES DANTON (1928) INTERNATIONAL PUBLISHERS CO., INC.
Hilaire Belloc, Danton: a study, Thomas Nelson & Sons, 1899.

External links

 
 

 
1759 births
1794 deaths
People from Aube
Politicians from Grand Est

People on the Committee of Public Safety
Deputies to the French National Convention
Regicides of Louis XVI
People of the Reign of Terror
18th-century French lawyers
Executed revolutionaries
French people executed by guillotine during the French Revolution